Individual jumping equestrian at the 2018 Asian Games was held in Jakarta International Equestrian Park, Jakarta, from 27 to 30 August 2018. This event had been held since equestrian made its debut at the Asian Games in 1982 New Delhi. Japan won a record three gold medals in this event ahead of Saudi Arabia with two gold medals, Kuwait, Philippines, and Qatar with one gold respectively.

Schedule
All times are Western Indonesia Time (UTC+07:00)

Results
Legend
EL — Eliminated
RT — Retired
WD — Withdrawn

Qualification

Qualifier 2

Final round 1

Final round 2

References

External links
Official website

Individual jumping